Rekabi or Al-Rekabi is a Persian-language surname. Notable people with the surname include:
 Ali Al-Rekabi (1986), Canadian amateur wrestler
 Elnaz Rekabi (1989), Iranian sport climber
 Hadi Rekabi (1985), Iranian footballer
 Walid Hassan Abdallah Ibrahim Al Rekabi (1991), Sudanese footballer

Persian-language surnames